Patrik Johancsik (born 9 May 1990) is a Slovak retired footballer who played as a striker and head coach of ŠK 1923 Gabčíkovo.

Career

Club career
Johancsik has previously played for Petržalka. In January 2011, he signed a three-year contract with Banská Bystrica. After a loan spell at Dunajská Streda, he moved to FC Stadlau, then in the fourth tier of Austrian football. He joined SV Hausleiten in 2013, but left the following year. He played for SC Orth between January 2015 and June 2015, and moved to SK Pama in July 2015.

Coaching career
In 2017, Johancsik became head coach of ŠTK Šamorín's U17 team. He later also coached the clubs B-team and the U15s.

In the summer 2020, he became head coach of Gabčíkovo.

References

External links
FK Dukla profile 

1990 births
Living people
Sportspeople from Dunajská Streda
Slovak footballers
Association football forwards
FC Petržalka players
FK Dukla Banská Bystrica players
FC DAC 1904 Dunajská Streda players
Slovak Super Liga players
Slovak football managers